Moi Station is a railway station located at the village of Moi in the municipality of Lund in Rogaland county, Norway.  The station is located along the Sørlandet Line. The station is served by regional trains operated by Go-Ahead Norge to the cities of Stavanger and Kristiansand.

History
The station was opened in 1904, when the Jæren Line was extended from Egersund to Flekkefjord. In 1943 the current station was built when it became part of the Sørlandet Line.

Railway stations in Rogaland
Railway stations on the Sørlandet Line
Railway stations opened in 1904
1904 establishments in Norway
Lund, Norway